The United Arab Emirates women's national under-20 football team represents United Arab Emirates in women's association football at the age of U-20 women's and is run by the United Arab Emirates Football Association (UAEFA). Its competes AFC U-20 Women's Asian Cup. The team yet to qualified FIFA U-20 Women's World Cup.

History
The United Arab Emirates women's national under-20 football team have play their debut game on 20 October 2018 versus Kyrgyzstan at Bishkek, Kyrgyzstan which they have defeated by 1–2 goals. The nation did not yet qualified to AFC U-20 Women's Asian Cup as well as FIFA U-20 Women's World Cup.

Current squad
The following squad were named for 2019 AFC U-19 Women's Championship qualification.

Fixtures and results
Legend

2018

2023

Competitive record

FIFA U-20 Women's World Cup

*Draws include knock-out matches decided on penalty kicks.

AFC U-20 Women's Asian Cup

AFC U-20 Women's Asian Cup qualification

WAFF U-18 Girls Championship

References

Arabic women's national under-20 association football teams
Asian women's national under-20 association football teams
United Arab Emirates women's national football team